Louis Devilleneuve is a retired French slalom canoeist who competed from the late 1960s to the mid-1970s. He won a bronze medal in the C-2 team event at the 1969 ICF Canoe Slalom World Championships in Bourg St.-Maurice.

References

External links 
 Louis DEVILLENEUVE at CanoeSlalom.net

French male canoeists
Living people
Year of birth missing (living people)
Medalists at the ICF Canoe Slalom World Championships